Kohtla is a village in Estonia.

Kohtla may also refer to:

 Kohtla Parish, municipality in Estonia
 Kohtla-Järve, city and municipality in Estonia
 Kohtla-Nõmme, borough in Estonia